The Women's sprint at the FIS Nordic World Ski Championships 2011 was held on 24 February 2011. Sprint qualifying at 13:00 CET with finals at 15:00 CET. The defending world champion was Italy's Arianna Follis while the defending Olympic champion was Norway's Marit Bjørgen.

Results

Qualification

Quarterfinals

Quarterfinal 1

Quarterfinal 2

Quarterfinal 3

Quarterfinal 4

Quarterfinal 5

Semifinals

Semifinal 1

Semifinal 2

Finals

See also
2011 IPC Biathlon and Cross-Country Skiing World Championships – Women's sprint

References

External links
Qualification
Results

FIS Nordic World Ski Championships 2011
2011 in Norwegian women's sport